Hua Chia-chih (Paiwan: Tjaravak Kadrangian; born 2 April 1936) is a Taiwanese politician.

Hua was born on 2 April 1936. He attended National Taiwan Normal University and became a teacher. He sat on the fifth and sixth convocations of the Taiwan Provincial Council, serving from 1973 to 1981. He was elected to the Legislative Yuan for two terms, in 1990 and 1993. Hua was appointed the first chairman of the Council of Aboriginal Affairs. In this role, he commented on the unemployment rate amongst indigenous people. Hua later served on the fourth convocation of the National Assembly in 2005.

References

1936 births
Living people
Kuomintang Members of the Legislative Yuan in Taiwan
Members of the 1st Legislative Yuan in Taiwan
Politicians of the Republic of China on Taiwan from Pingtung County
Aboriginal Members of the Legislative Yuan
Government ministers of Taiwan
Members of the 2nd Legislative Yuan
20th-century Taiwanese educators
Taiwanese schoolteachers
21st-century Taiwanese politicians
National Taiwan Normal University alumni
Paiwan people